This is a list of college athletics programs in the U.S. state of Virginia.

Notes:
This list is in a tabular format, with columns arranged in the following order, from left to right:
Athletic team description (short school name and nickname), with a link to the school's athletic program article if it exists. When only one nickname is listed, it is used for teams of both genders.(Note that in recent years, many schools have chosen to use the same nickname for men's and women's teams even when the nickname is distinctly masculine.) When two nicknames are given, the first is used for men's teams and the other is used for women's teams. Different nicknames for a specific sport within a school are noted separately below the table.
Full name of school.
Location of school.
Conference of the school (if conference column is left blank, the school is either independent or the conference is unknown).
Apart from the ongoing conversions, the following notes apply:
Following the normal standard of U.S. sports media, the terms "University" and "College" are ignored in alphabetization, unless necessary to distinguish schools (such as Boston College and Boston University) or are actually used by the media in normally describing the school (formerly the case for the College of Charleston, but media now use "Charleston" for that school's athletic program).
Schools are also alphabetized by the names they are most commonly referred to by sports media, with non-intuitive examples included in parentheses next to the school name. This means, for example, that campuses bearing the name "University of North Carolina" may variously be found at "C" (Charlotte), "N" (North Carolina, referring to the Chapel Hill campus), and "U" (the Asheville, Greensboro, Pembroke, and Wilmington campuses, all normally referred to as UNC-{campus name}).
The prefix "St.", as in "Saint", is alphabetized as if it were spelled out.

NCAA

Division I

Division II

Division III

NAIA

NJCAA

USCAA

Independent

See also 
List of NCAA Division I institutions
List of NCAA Division II institutions
List of NCAA Division III institutions
List of NAIA institutions
List of USCAA institutions
List of NCCAA institutions

Virginia
College athletic programs
College sports in Virginia
College athletic programs